All Day DeShay: AM is the fifth mixtape by rapper, producer brandUn DeShay (later known as Ace Hashimoto). The album is almost entirely produced by DeShay himself.

Track listing

References

2011 albums
Albums produced by Battlecat (producer)